The following is a List of The Goon Show episodes. The Goon Show was a popular and influential British radio comedy series, originally produced by the BBC from 1951 to 1960 and broadcast on the BBC Home Service.

Availability of The Goon Show episodes

Lost episodes
Many of the earliest radio episodes no longer exist. When the first episodes were broadcast, recording technology was still expensive and primitive by later standards. Audio tape was not in general use, and any recordings were made directly on to acetate discs. These could be played back, but tended to wear out quickly and did not survive unless further processed to create a master disc, which was only done for recordings intended for sale. Only one episode from the fourth series was preserved in the BBC Sound Archive (as a tape dub from an acetate disc).

Other episodes from Series 2–4 have survived, sometimes in incomplete form, as off-air recordings of varying quality. Four episodes from Series 4 were released on CD as The Goon Show: Series Four, Part One (2010). A further seven episodes from Series 2–4 are included in The Goon Show Compendium Volume 13 (2017) along with the only surviving fragment of the Series 4 episode "The Giant Bombardon". Volume 14 (2018) includes all of the remaining Series 4 episodes, including those from the 2010 set.

The special episodes "Archie in Goonland" (1954) (a crossover with Educating Archie) and "The Missing Christmas Parcel – Post Early for Christmas" (1955) (a 15-minute insert in Children's Hour) are also believed lost.

Surviving episodes
Commencing with the start of the fifth series (in 1954), BBC Transcription Services began making copies for overseas sales, and even commissioned re-recordings of some key fourth series episodes for the "Vintage Goons" series, which was mainly intended for overseas markets.

The BBC Transcription Services versions were then cut to remove topical and parochial material and anything that might be potentially offensive. Later, BBC Transcription Services releases had further cuts for timing purposes. For many years, these abridged versions were thought to be only surviving copies of many episodes, but in recent years restoration experts such as Ted Kendall have found and restored a considerable amount of missing material.

According to Kendall's sleeve notes to the Goon Show Compendium CD box sets, Transcription Services originally seem to have used the original broadcast tapes as the basis for their versions, making cuts as necessary. The cut material was often spliced onto the end of the reels in case it needed to be restored. When the "Vintage Goons" series began, episodes were recorded by TS at Maida Vale. Since these were performed on the same nights as Series 8 episodes, it made sense for Transcription Services to make their own simultaneous recordings at Maida Vale and it seems that this technique was also used on Series 9 and 10. These were then edited to match the broadcast versions before TS made its own cuts. However, it seems that in some cases the TS versions inadvertently preserve lines slated for deletion, meaning that longer cuts of these episodes can be reassembled.

To date, the BBC has released 30 CD sets of these re-mastered episodes (originally on audio cassette tapes), containing 120 shows, plus an additional CD set comprising The Last Goon Show of All and Goon Again. Another twelve shows had been previously issued by EMI, but for contractual reasons these were all heavily cut to remove musical interludes and other music cues. Until 2015 these were the only commercially available versions of those particular episodes, but three of them are included without the cuts, in their original chronological order, on The Goon Show Compendium Volume 11, indicating that the rights to at least the earliest EMI releases had by then reverted to the BBC. It was later confirmed that Volume 12, released on 3 November 2016, would include all of the remaining "missing" episodes, plus The Last Goon Show of All and bonus features.

The 25th CD set, as well as the first of a new series of Goon Show Compendiums (which contains the first 13 episodes of series 5), were released on 7 April 2008. The Compendiums' bonus material includes notes by Ted Kendall, audio researcher and restorer, on the sources used for the recordings, which include BBC Sound Archive and Transcription Services master tapes and discs, unofficial copies made by engineers or other BBC staff, and even domestic off-air recordings from which a few cut lines were restored.

Broadcasting
Episodes of The Goon Show are still occasionally repeated on BBC Radio 2 or Radio 4 in the United Kingdom. More recently the show has become a regular feature on the digital radio station BBC Radio 4 Extra, which features both new material and archives from several decades of BBC comedy and drama.

The ABC Radio National network in Australia has regularly broadcast The Goon Show since the 1960s. For many years, the series was broadcast every Saturday afternoon, just after the midday news bulletin. More recently, it was broadcast twice a week, on Friday mornings and Sunday afternoons. The network took the series off the air in January 2004, but following listener response to the cancellation, broadcasts of the show resumed in the Friday time slot in June. The ABC's broadcasts of the series have made The Goon Show one of the most repeated and longest-running of all radio programmes.

The programme has been broadcast in the United States. NBC broadcast The Goon Show as early as the mid-1950s. Terry Gilliam of the Goon-influenced Monty Python comedy troupe recalled first hearing it broadcast on FM radio in New York City in the 1960s. When Vermont Public Radio signed on the air in 1977 (as a single station which has since evolved into a statewide network), the first programme to air was an episode of The Goon Show. The show was described as a "madcap radio comedy classic".

Episodes 
The following list of episodes of The Goon Show includes any "specials" and all episodes made for the BBC Transcription Service unaired domestically at the time (and therefore listed at the date of their recording).

Series overview

One-off special shows

First series: Crazy People (1951)

Cast: Peter Sellers, Harry Secombe, Spike Milligan, Michael Bentine, The Ray Ellington Quartet, The Stargazers, Max Geldray and the BBC Dance Orchestra, conducted by Stanley Black.
Announcer: Andrew Timothy
The shows were all recorded on a Sunday; episodes 1–9 were broadcast on Mondays, 10–17 were broadcast on Thursdays. No episodes are known to survive.

Second series (1952)

Cast: Peter Sellers, Harry Secombe, Spike Milligan, Michael Bentine, The Ray Ellington Quartet, Max Geldray and the BBC Dance Orchestra, conducted by Stanley Black. The Stargazers were present for the first six shows only.
Announcer: Andrew Timothy
The shows were all recorded on a Sunday, except episodes 24 and 25; all episodes were broadcast on Tuesdays. Only three episodes are known to survive as truncated, off-air recordings.

Third series (1952–53)
Cast: Peter Sellers, Harry Secombe, Spike Milligan, with Max Geldray and The Ray Ellington Quartet, conducted by Wally Stott.
Announcer: Andrew Timothy
The shows were all broadcast on Tuesdays, with the exception of episode 7, a Christmas special. Only one excerpt and one full episode are known to survive.

Fourth series (1953–54)
Cast: Peter Sellers, Harry Secombe, Spike Milligan, with Max Geldray and The Ray Ellington Quartet, conducted by Wally Stott.
Announcers: Andrew Timothy (Episodes 1–5) and Wallace Greenslade (Episodes 6–30, plus specials)
Episodes 1–20 were broadcast on Fridays; episodes 21–30 on Mondays.

Fifth series (1954–55)
Cast: Peter Sellers, Harry Secombe, Spike Milligan, with Max Geldray and The Ray Ellington Quartet, conducted by Wally Stott.
Announcer: Wallace Greenslade
The shows were all broadcast on Tuesdays. All episodes from this and subsequent series survive.

Sixth series (1955–56)
Cast: Peter Sellers, Harry Secombe, Spike Milligan, with Max Geldray and The Ray Ellington Quartet, conducted by Wally Stott.
Announcer: Wallace Greenslade
The shows were all broadcast on Tuesdays.

Seventh series (1956–57)
Cast: Peter Sellers, Harry Secombe, Spike Milligan, with Max Geldray and The Ray Ellington Quartet, conducted by Wally Stott.
Announcer: Wallace Greenslade
The shows were all broadcast on Tuesdays, except episodes 10 and 13, which were on Wednesdays.

Eighth series (1957–58)
Cast: Peter Sellers, Harry Secombe, Spike Milligan, with Max Geldray and The Ray Ellington Quartet, conducted by Wally Stott.
Announcer: Wallace Greenslade
The shows were all broadcast on Mondays.

Vintage Goons series (1957–58)
Cast: Peter Sellers, Harry Secombe, Spike Milligan, with Max Geldray and The Ray Ellington Quartet, conducted by Wally Stott.
Announcer: Wallace Greenslade
The following episodes were especially recorded for overseas stations only during the Eighth Series and were re-recordings of earlier episodes. Six of these episodes were broadcast prior to the commencement of the Ninth series, which is why the Ninth series was shorter. However, many of these episodes were not broadcast in the United Kingdom until the 1980s or 1990s. So for contextual purposes, the recording dates are listed alongside the original airdates in the United Kingdom.

Ninth series (1958–59)
Cast: Peter Sellers, Harry Secombe, Spike Milligan, with Max Geldray and The Ray Ellington Quartet, conducted by Wally Stott.
Announcer: Wallace Greenslade
The shows were all broadcast on Mondays, except episode 12, which was on a Tuesday.

Tenth series (1959–60)
Cast: Peter Sellers, Harry Secombe, Spike Milligan, with Max Geldray and The Ray Ellington Quartet, conducted by Wally Stott.
Announcer: Wallace Greenslade
The shows were all broadcast on Thursdays.

Specials (1968–2001)
 "Tales of Men's Shirts" (8 August 1968; Thames Television)
 "The Last Goon Show of All" (5 October 1972)
 "Goon Again: the 50th Anniversary Cardboard Replica Goon Show" (29 May 2001)

Notes and references 

Notes

References

Bibliography

 
Lost BBC episodes
Lists of British radio series episodes